Enoch Heinrich Kisch (6 May 1841 - 1918) was an Austrian balneologist and gynecologist born in Prague. He was the brother of Alexander Kisch (1848-1917), a noted rabbi and author.

He studied medicine in Prague, and in 1863 began work as a balneologist in Marienbad, where he was instrumental in developing the site as a popular spa and resort. In 1867 he was appointed lecturer at Prague, and in 1884 became an associate professor in balneotherapy at the university. 

From 1868 Kisch was an editor of the Allgemeine Balneologische Zeitung (General Balneological Newspaper). He also provided information on balneotherapeutics to the System of Physiologic Therapeutics, a publication based in Philadelphia. In addition to balneology, he conducted extensive research in the fields of gynecology and female sexuality. One of his better known books was translated into English in 1910 with the title The Sexual Life of Woman in its Physiological, Pathological and Hygienic Aspects.

Selected publications 
 Ueber den Einfluss der Fettleibigkeit auf die Weiblichen Sexualorgane, Prague, 1873
 Das Climacterische Alter der Frauen und die Behandlungen der Leiden der Menopause, Erlangen, 1874 
 Handbuch der Allgemeinen und Speciellen Balneotherapie, (Textbook of general and special balneotherapy), Vienna, 1875
 Die Lipomatosis Universalis, ib. 1888
 Grundriss der Klinischen Balneotherapie, (Outline of clinical balneotherapy), ib. 1897
 Uterus und Herz, (Uterus and heart), ib. 1898
 Das Geschlechtsleben des Weibes in physilogischer, pathologischer und hygienischer Beziehung, (The Sexual Life of Woman in Its Physiological, Pathological and Hygienic Aspects)
 Die sexuelle Untreue der Frau. second part: Das feile Weib. Eine sozialmedizinische Studie, 1917

References 
 Enoch Heinrich Kisch biography @ Jewish Encyclopedia
 Kisch, Enoch Heinrich. In: Österreichisches Biographisches Lexikon 1815–1950, Volume 3 (Lfg. 14, 1964), p. 349 (German)

External links 

1841 births
1918 deaths
19th-century Austrian people
Austrian gynaecologists
Physicians from Prague